A Summer to Remember is a 1985 American family television drama film written and directed by Robert Michael Lewis and starring James Farentino, Tess Harper and Louise Fletcher.

Plot
Two young children find an Orangutan living in their treehouse. Toby who uses sign finds out that the Orangutan can sign and his little sister interprets. They get up one morning and take the Orangutan out and go on an adventure.. The parents take the kids to see a circus and there is a sick gorilla there called mad max who is really poorly.. The children come home and find that Kacey the Orangutan has gone.. They try to find her but she ends up been captured and they put Kacey in the same cage as Max until they can find her owner.. The children steal the keys and let them both go.. Then there is an Orangutan and a gorilla on the loose followed by the owners and police with guns and vets.. Max is shot with sleeping drugs and gets the help he needed and Kacey goes back to her owners and Toby regains his speech.

Cast 
James Farentino as Tom Wyler 
Tess Harper as Jeannie Wyler 
  Bridgette Andersen  as Jill
 Sean Gerlis  as Toby 
 Burt Young 	 as Fidel Fargo
 Louise Fletcher 	 as Dr. Dolly McKeever
 Dennis Haysbert  as Sheriff Pierce
 Molly Cheek as Trish
 Dennis Fimple as Smitty 
 Corey Brunish as Meadows

References

External links

1985 drama films
1985 films
Films scored by Charles Fox
1980s English-language films
Films directed by Robert Michael Lewis